Žicanje is the first solo album by the Croatian guitarist Jurica Pađen, released through Croatia Records in September 2005. The album was recorded in early 2005 in SYAM Studio in Zagreb and contains 15 instrumental tracks featuring Remo Cartagine, Tomislav Šojat, Ana Šuto and Nikša Bratoš. The album release was followed by video for "Google Boogie", which was the only single from the album.

Track listing
All music written by Jurica Pađen, all arrangements by Jurica Pađen and Remo Cartagine.

Personnel 
Musicians
Jurica Pađen – Guitars
Remo Cartagine – Bass Guitar, Keyboards, Drum Programming
Tomislav Šojat – Bass Guitar in tracks 4, 6, 9
Ana Šuto – Keyboards
Nikša Bratoš – Acoustic Guitar in track 13

Artwork
Nika Pavlinek – Photography
Antun Babogredac – Design

Production
Jurica Pađen – Producer
Remo Cartagine – Producer, Engineer

References

External links
 Official Facebook page

Jurica Pađen albums
2005 albums
Croatia Records albums